Avacha is a river in the southern part of the Kamchatka Peninsula, Russia. It flows southeast into Avacha Bay, near Petropavlovsk-Kamchatsky. Nineteenth-century travelers like George Kennan ascended the Avacha as far as possible and then took horses to the upper course of the river Kamchatka to travel further north.

The town of Yelizovo, which houses the Petropavlovsk-Kamchatsky Airport, is on the banks of the Avacha.

References

Rivers of Kamchatka Krai
Drainage basins of the Pacific Ocean